The McCulla House is a historic house located at 422 East 1st Street in Thibodaux, Louisiana.

Built in c.1907, the structure is a two-story frame residence in Queen Anne Revival style with Colonial Revival gallery columns. The building features an octagonal turret with faceted roof, an horseshoe arched balcony and an Ionic gallery which turns 45 degrees at the corners.

The house was listed on the National Register of Historic Places on March 5, 1986.

It is one of 14 individually NRHP-listed properties in the "Thibodaux Multiple Resource Area", which also includes:
Bank of Lafourche Building
Breaux House
Building at 108 Green Street
Chanticleer Gift Shop
Citizens Bank of Lafourche
Grand Theatre
Lamartina Building

Peltier House
Percy-Lobdell Building
Riviere Building
Riviere House
Robichaux House
St. Joseph Co-Cathedral and Rectory

See also
 National Register of Historic Places listings in Lafourche Parish, Louisiana

References

Houses on the National Register of Historic Places in Louisiana
Queen Anne architecture in Louisiana
Colonial Revival architecture in Louisiana
Houses completed in 1907
Lafourche Parish, Louisiana
National Register of Historic Places in Lafourche Parish, Louisiana